= Placoma =

Ancient settlement in Turkey

Coordinates: 36°23′00″N 29°57′54″E

Placoma or Plakoma was a town of ancient Lycia.

Its site was located near modern Çağman in Asiatic Turkey.
